The Football competition in the 2009 Summer Universiade were held on different venues in Serbia between 30 June and 10 July 2009.

Men

Women

References

 
2009 Summer Universiade
Universiade
2009